Thomas Wedgwood IV (1716, Burslem–23 February 1773, Burslem) was an English master potter who taught his illustrious youngest brother Josiah Wedgwood the trade. Wedgwood was the son of the potter Thomas Wedgwood III and his wife Mary Stringer. He married twice, first to Isabell Beech (1722–1750), who had five children, two of whom died in infancy.

with Isabell Beech:
 Thomas Wedgwood V (c. 1744–1786), master potter of the Overhouse, from whom descends the famous ceramic designer Clarice Cliff.
 John Wedgwood (born and died 1746)
 Catherine Wedgwood (1748–1750)
 Sarah Wedgwood (1774–1856) married (1) John Taylor (2) the Reverend John Richardson
 Mary Wedgwood (1750–?) married Josiah Wood.

Wedgwood married again in 175] to Jane Richards (1715–1785) and they had three children:

 William Wedgwood (1755–1837) of Bournehayes Gentleman.
 John Wedgwood (1758–1782)
 Jane (?–?)

Wedgwood was the principal heir of Katherine Wedgwood Egerton (1682/1683-1705) a rich widow, who was his first cousin once removed, their shared ancestor being Thomas Wedgwood I.

External links 
 https://web.archive.org/web/20091020102041/http://geocities.com/Heartland/3203/WBped.html

1716 births
1773 deaths
Darwin–Wedgwood family
English potters
Wedgwood pottery